Four mass shootings have occurred in Seattle, Washington:
 Wah Mee massacre, in 1983
 Capitol Hill massacre, in 2006
 Seattle Jewish Federation shooting, in 2006
 Seattle café shootings, in 2012

See also
 Mass shootings in Washington (state)